Cirrus Minor may refer to:

 A small (minor) cloud (cirrus)
 Blackburn Cirrus Minor, a British aircraft engine
 Cirrus Minor (song), song by Pink Floyd